Johan Bertil Karl von Wachenfeldt (4 March 1909 – 30 September 1995) was a Swedish sprinter who specialized in the 400 m distance. He competed in the 4 × 400 m relay at the 1928 and 1936 Summer Olympics and finished in fourth and fifth place, respectively; in 1936 he failed to reach the final of the individual 400 m event.

Wachenfeldt won three bronze medals at the European championships: two in 1934 and one in 1938. He won the national 400 m title in 1935 and 1938 and held the national records over 300 m and 400 m.

References

External links
 

1909 births
1995 deaths
Swedish male sprinters
Olympic athletes of Sweden
Athletes (track and field) at the 1928 Summer Olympics
Athletes (track and field) at the 1936 Summer Olympics
European Athletics Championships medalists
20th-century Swedish people